Andrew Ivor Vince (born 1959), is a male former athlete who competed for Maldon, Essex England.

Athletics career
Vince was a National champion after winning the 1982 UK Athletics Championships in the shot put. He represented England, at the 1986 Commonwealth Games in Edinburgh, Scotland.

Andy Vince. Head of People Systems and Insight at Barts Health NHS Trust ·

Andy Vince. Regional Vice President Canada at SCA Tissue North America. SCA Tissue North AmericaWeston. Barrie, Ontario, Canada500+ connections.

References

1959 births
Athletes (track and field) at the 1986 Commonwealth Games
Living people
British male shot putters
English male shot putters
Commonwealth Games competitors for England